The 1904 Brooklyn Superbas finished in sixth place with a 65–97 record.

Offseason 
 December 12, 1903: Bill Dahlen was traded by the Superbas to the New York Giants for Charlie Babb, Jack Cronin and cash.
 January 16, 1904: Bill Bergen was purchased by the Superbas from the Cincinnati Reds.
 March 1904: Ed Poole was purchased by the Superbas from the Cincinnati Reds.

Regular season

Season standings

Record vs. opponents

Notable transactions 
 April 30, 1904: Jack Doyle and Deacon Van Buren were purchased from the Superbas by the Philadelphia Phillies.
 August 1, 1904: Doc Scanlan was purchased by the Superbas from the Pittsburgh Pirates.
August 27: Fred Mitchell was purchased by the Superbas from the Philadelphia Phillies.

Roster

Player stats

Batting

Starters by position 
Note: Pos = Position; G = Games played; AB = At bats; R = Runs; H = Hits; Avg. = Batting average; HR = Home runs; RBI = Runs batted in; SB = Stolen bases

Other batters 
Note: G = Games played; AB = At bats; R = Runs; H = Hits; Avg. = Batting average; HR = Home runs; RBI = Runs batted in; SB = Stolen bases

Pitching

Starting pitchers 
Note: G = Games pitched; GS = Games started; IP = Innings pitched; W = Wins; L = Losses; ERA = Earned run average; BB = Bases on balls; SO = Strikeouts; CG = Complete games

Other pitchers 
Note: G = Games pitched; GS = Games started; IP = Innings pitched; W = Wins; L = Losses; ERA = Earned run average; BB = Bases on balls; SO = Strikeouts; CG = Complete games

Relief pitchers 
Note: G = Games pitched; IP = Innings pitched; W = Wins; L = Losses; SV = Saves; ERA = Earned run average; BB = Bases on balls; SO = Strikeouts

Notes

References 
Baseball-Reference season page
Baseball Almanac season page

External links 
1904 Brooklyn Superbas uniform
Brooklyn Dodgers reference site
Acme Dodgers page 
Retrosheet

Los Angeles Dodgers seasons
Brooklyn Superbas season
Brook
1900s in Brooklyn
Park Slope